The list of ship launches in 1986 includes a chronological list of all ships launched in 1986.


References

1986
Ship launches